Francis M. "Frank" Carroll (born 1938) is an American figure skating coach and former competitive skater. He has coached three skaters to win the World Figure Skating Championships: Linda Fratianne, Michelle Kwan, and Evan Lysacek. Lysacek won the men's Olympic gold medal in 2010 at Vancouver.

Carroll has been inducted into the World Figure Skating Hall of Fame, the United States Figure Skating Hall of Fame, the Professional Skaters Association Coaches Hall of Fame, and was the 1997 Olympic Coach of the Year.

Competitive and professional career
Carroll grew up in Worcester, Massachusetts. When he was in his early teens, a skating rink opened in his neighborhood and he began skating, interested by the combination of artistry and athleticism. After graduating from the College of the Holy Cross in 1960 with a B.S. in Sociology, Carroll eventually moved to Winchester, Massachusetts and lived with his coach Maribel Vinson Owen and her daughters on weekends.

Carroll won the bronze medal on the junior level at the 1959 U.S. Championships. He won the bronze medal on the junior level at the 1960 U.S. Championships behind Douglas Ramsay. Carroll turned professional after that and was skating with the Ice Follies at the time of the Sabena Flight 548 crash.

Carroll skated with the Ice Follies until 1964. He was accepted to law school at the University of San Francisco, but chose to pursue acting. He appeared in the background of several beach films, including The Loved One.

Carroll began coaching on the side to support himself and eventually decided to coach full-time. His notable students include Linda Fratianne, Christopher Bowman, Michelle Kwan, Timothy Goebel, Gracie Gold, Denis Ten, and Evan Lysacek. He was the head coach for the Toyota Sports Center in El Segundo, California. In 2011, he began coaching at a newly built rink in Cathedral City, California to be closer to his home in Palm Springs, California, one of his homes since the 1980s. Carroll resumed coaching at the Toyota Sports Center on June 1, 2013.

Results

Coaching career
Carroll's current and former students include: 

Robert Bradshaw Coached him to a Silver at U.S. Nationals in 1973.
Christopher Bowman. Coached him to the U.S. National title and a World silver medal in 1989 and to a World Bronze medal in 1990.
Nicole Bobek
Tiffany Chin. Coached her to two World bronze medals.
Ellie Kawamura.
Mark Cockerell.
Silvia Fontana
Linda Fratianne. Coached her to two World Championships and to an Olympic silver medal in 1980.
Timothy Goebel. Coached him to the 2002 and 2003 World silver medals and the 2002 Olympic bronze medal. Carroll ended his coaching relationship with Goebel in November 2004 following the 2004 NHK Trophy
 Gracie Gold, from September 2013-January 2017. Coached her to two U.S. national titles.
 Kristiene Gong.
Danielle Kahle.
Jennifer Kirk.
Carolina Kostner.
Karen Kwan.
Michelle Kwan. He coached her to four World Championships and an Olympic silver medal in 1998. In the fall of 2001, Kwan and Carroll decided to end their coaching relationship. In interviews, Kwan said she needed to "take responsibility" for her skating.
Beatrisa Liang.
Evan Lysacek. He coached him to a World Championship in 2009 and an Olympic gold medal in 2010.
Ye Bin Mok
Daisuke Murakami.
Mirai Nagasu (from May 2009 to April 2012)
Angela Nikodinov.
Denis Ten. He coached him to the 2013 World silver medal and 2014 Olympic bronze medal.

He has coached skaters to win the World Figure Skating Championships during the era of compulsory figures (Fratianne), after compulsory figures (Kwan), and under the ISU Judging System (Lysacek). He also coached Lysacek to an Olympic gold medal.

Carroll was inducted into the United States Figure Skating Hall of Fame in 1996. He is the first figure skating coach to be named the Olympic Coach of the Year, which happened in 1997.

On March 6, 2007, it was announced that he had been elected to the World Figure Skating Hall of Fame. He was inducted on March 22, 2007 during the 2007 World Figure Skating Championships, between the original dance and the men's free skate.

On July 29, 2018, it was announced that Carroll would be retiring from coaching on August 3. Carroll plans to continue working with U.S. Figure Skating and the junior development program.

References

External links

 Toyota Sports Center Instructor bio
 

American male single skaters
American figure skating coaches
Living people
1939 births
College of the Holy Cross alumni
Sportspeople from Worcester, Massachusetts
American Olympic coaches